The 1977 Belgian International Championships was a men's tennis tournament staged at the Leopold Club in Brussels, Belgium that was part of the Grand Prix circuit and categorized as a Two star event. The tournament was played on outdoor clay courts and was held from 6 June until 12 June 1977. It was the sixth edition of the tournament and first-seeded Harold Solomon won the singles title.

Finals

Singles
 Harold Solomon defeated  Karl Meiler 7–5, 3–6, 2–6, 6–3, 6–4
 It was Solomon's 1st singles title of the year and the 11th of his career.

Doubles
 Željko Franulović /  Nikola Pilić and  František Pála /  Balázs Taróczy final not played, title shared

References

Belgian International Championships
Belgian International Championships
Belgian International Championships, 1977